Stainach is a former municipality in the district of Liezen in the Austrian state of Styria. Since the 2015 Styria municipal structural reform, it is part of the municipality Stainach-Pürgg.

Geography
Stainach lies in the Enns valley.

References

Cities and towns in Liezen District